Events from the year 1680 in Sweden

Incumbents
 Monarch – Charles XI

Events

 Wedding between the King and Ulrika Eleonora of Denmark.
 In the Riksdagen 1680, Charles XI introduces absolute monarchy in Sweden by banning the council from making suggestions unless asked to bey the monarch.  
 During the Riksdag, the Great Reversion is introduced: The Baronies and Counties of the nobility, the donations from the foreign provinces, and all donations worth more than 600 silver a year is reverted to the crown, which leads to the confiscation of about 80 percent of all the property donated from the crown to the high nobility during the 17th-century.
 
 
 Wenerid by Skogekär Bergbo.

Births

Deaths

 10 June - Johan Göransson Gyllenstierna, statesman  (born 1635) 
 2 September - Per Brahe the Younger, statesman  (born 1602) 
 Debora van der Plas, business person (born 1616)

References

External links

 
Years of the 17th century in Sweden
Sweden